Charles-Édouard Coridon (born 9 April 1973) is a Martiniquais former professional footballer who played as a midfielder.

Club career 
Whilst at Guingamp, Coridon won the 1996 UEFA Intertoto Cup. At Paris Saint-Germain, he is best remembered for scoring a scorpion kick in the UEFA Champions League against Porto in 2004. The goal was fourth-placed in a countdown of the top Champions League goals of all time by ITV Sport.

International career 
Coridon represented the France U21 national team at the 1996 UEFA European Under-21 Championship, but he was reported to have turned down France on the senior level. He said that France had 'enough top-quality' players and he would not be needed. Coridon would go on to play for the Martinique national team at the 1993 and 2003 CONCACAF Gold Cup.

Honours 
Guingamp

 UEFA Intertoto Cup: 1996

References

1973 births
Living people
People from Le François
Association football midfielders
Martiniquais footballers
France under-21 international footballers
French footballers
French people of Martiniquais descent
Club Franciscain players
En Avant Guingamp players
RC Lens players
Paris Saint-Germain F.C. players
MKE Ankaragücü footballers
2003 CONCACAF Gold Cup players
French expatriate footballers
Ligue 1 players
Süper Lig players
Expatriate footballers in Turkey
France youth international footballers
Martinique international footballers
1993 CONCACAF Gold Cup players